Vulpia elliotea, known by the common name sand fescue or squirreltail fescue, is an annual grass native to the southeastern United States. Its specific epithet elliotea is named for its discoverer, Stephen Elliott.

Description

Its leaf sheaths are glabrous, and its blades are typically glabrous though they can be scabrous above. The grass flowers from May to June.

Distribution and habitat

Vulpia elliotea grows in dry, sandy prairies from New Jersey to Texas, up to southern Illinois and Missouri.

References

Plants described in 1945
Pooideae